Swantham Lekhakan, also known as Swa. Le., is a 2009 Malayalam film directed and co-produced by debuting filmmaker P. Sukumar and scripted by Kalavoor Ravikumar. Dileep and Gopika play the lead roles while Nedumudi Venu,  Innocent and Salim Kumar play major supporting roles.

The film was mainly shot at various locations in Thodupuzha.

This is the 4th film Dileep and Gopika appeared in together after Chanthupottu, Pachakkuthira and The Don. This is Gopika's first film after her marriage. This film was releasing along with another Dileep starrer film, Kerala Cafe. P. Sukumar won Kerala State Film Award for Best Debut Director for this film.

Cast

References

External links

2009 films
2000s Malayalam-language films
2009 directorial debut films